Senator Ball may refer to:

Members of the United States Senate
Joseph H. Ball (1905–1993), U.S. Senator from Minnesota from 1940 to 1942
L. Heisler Ball (1861–1932), U.S. Senator from Delaware from 1919 to 1925

United States state senate members
George Washington Ball (Iowa Democrat) (1847–1915), Iowa State Senate from 1900 to 1904
George Washington Ball (Iowa Republican) (1848–1920), Iowa State Senate from 1917 to 1920
Greg Ball (politician) (born 1977), New York State Senate
William Lee Ball (1781–1824), Virginia State Senate
William Ball (Michigan politician) (1830–1902), Michigan State Senate

See also
Senator Beall (disambiguation)